The Monarchist National Party (PNM) was a political party in Italy founded in 1946, uniting conservatives, liberal conservatives and nationalists. It was a right-wing competitor to Christian Democracy and was especially strong in Southern Italy.

History
The party's best electoral result was in the 1953 general election, when the party scored 6.9% and came fourth after Christian Democracy, the Italian Communist Party and the Italian Socialist Party.

In 1954 the party suffered a major split led by Achille Lauro, mayor of Naples from 1952 to 1957, who formed the People's Monarchist Party (PMP), which was closer to Christian Democracy. In the 1958 general election, the PNM won 2.2% of the vote, while the rival PMP 2.6%.

In 1959 the two monarchist parties joined the Italian Democratic Party (PDI).

Electoral results

Italian Parliament

References

1946 establishments in Italy
1959 disestablishments in Italy
Defunct political parties in Italy
Monarchist parties in Italy
Political parties established in 1946
Political parties disestablished in 1959